Group Portrait with Lady can refer to:

 Group Portrait with Lady (novel), a novel by Heinrich Böll
 Group Portrait with Lady (film), a 1977 film based on the novel, directed by Aleksandar Petrović